This is a list of notable butter dishes and foods in which butter is used as a primary ingredient or as a significant component of a dish or a food. Butter is a dairy product that consists of butterfat, milk proteins, and water. It is made by churning fresh or fermented cream or milk.

Butter dishes and foods

 
 
 
 
 
 
 
 
 
 
 
 
 
 
 
 
 
 
 
 
 
 
 , or beurre composé
 
 
 
 
 
 , or beurre à la bourguignonne

See also

 List of dairy products
 List of pastries
 List of spreads
 Mound of Butter (Vollon) – famous painting depicting butter

References

 
Butter